Ronaț is a district of Timișoara.

History 
A rural settlement from the Daco-Roman era (2nd–4th centuries AD) and an incineration necropolis from the Early Middle Ages (10th–11th centuries) were discovered here in the 1980s. Both were listed in the National Register of Historic Monuments in 2004.

Ronaț appeared around 1900 as a workers' colony. The history of this district is closely linked to CFR, most of Ronaț's inhabitants being at some point its employees and their families. The CFR Pavilions were built in the 1930s. Initially, they served as homes for CFR staff, being later converted into a halt mainly for commuters. The current station, from which Ronaț got its name, is today a freight terminal.

Gallery

References 

Districts of Timișoara